Tymur Mykhaylovych Korablin (born 2 January 2002) is a Ukrainian professional footballer who plays as a right midfielder for Ukrainian Premier League club Kryvbas Kryvyi Rih.

References

External links
 
 

2002 births
Living people
Footballers from Zaporizhzhia
Ukrainian footballers
Association football midfielders
FC Metalurh Zaporizhzhia players
FC Metalurh-2 Zaporizhzhia players
FC Kryvbas Kryvyi Rih players
Ukrainian Premier League players
Ukrainian Amateur Football Championship players